Edith Ellis (June 1866 – December 27, 1960) (also known as Edith Ellis Baker) was an American actress, director, and playwright. She began her career as a child actress, and then began writing, directing, and producing. Ellis operated several theatres and touring companies throughout her lifetime. She is the author of over thirty-five plays. While not an outspoken feminist, Ellis’s work continuously focused on the issues of women. She also developed her own theory on directing, with a focus on the agency of the actor. Numerous times throughout her life, Ellis produced and directed her own writing.

Biography
Ellis was born in Coldwater, Branch County, Michigan. She was the older sister of actor Edward Ellis. Her father, Edward C. Ellis, was a Shakespearean actor who began her career by putting her behind the curtain and on the stage from a very early age. Her first part was at age six, and by ten she was a star.  Three plays were written for her before her twelfth birthday. At fourteen, Ellis fell ill. During this time, she turned her attention to writing plays rather than acting. She married Frank Baker, a theatre manager, in about 1895. They were married until his death in 1907. Their daughter, Ellis Baker, became an actress. Edith later married C. Becher Furness, a Canadian, in 1909.

Career

Director 
Ellis began her work as a director with the help of her husband, theatre manager Frank Baker. Ellis and husband  secured and managed the Park Theatre in Brooklyn from 1901 to 1902. Ellis was the primary stage director there and her husband managed the administrative end until the theatre burned down at the end of the 1902 season.

Ellis and Baker then leased the Criterion Theatre, also in Brooklyn, where Ellis continued to direct plays. While there, Ellis formed the Baker Stock Company. According to Ellis, this is when she did the "hardest work of [her] life, playing the leading roles in a new play every week, directing rehearsals, rewriting plays, planning scenery and properties and fairly living in the theatre.”  They later moved to the Berkeley Lyceum in New York City where she directed her own play, The Point of View.

In 1907, Frank Baker died. After his death, Ellis took back her maiden name and resumed directing, acting, and writing. Several times Ellis was head of her own stock companies, travelling or stationary, and wrote, produced, directed, and acted in many plays.

In 1908, Ellis acquired the New York Playhouse in Brooklyn. In 1909, Edith Ellis joined the Society of Dramatic Authors, a feminist group for women dramatics. Including members like Rachel Crothers, this group was a way for Ellis to network with other women in the industry.

Playwright 
Her first writing attempt was out of necessity, when she and her brother, Edward, were stranded on the road by the unexpected disbanding of their theatrical company.  The play was successful enough to pay their way home.

Ellis' plots typically followed one of three trajectories. All three centered around women's issues.
 The unhappy life of a married woman (Mary Jane's Pa, 1910)
 Women in the workforce (The Point of View, 1903)
 Women above the age of forty (The White Villa, 1921)
Ellis had difficulty in getting some of her plays produced, as in the case of The White Villa. The White Villa is a play about a woman in an unfulfilled marriage who decides to leave her husband. The play ends with the leading woman now living her life alone while her ex-husband has remarried a younger woman.

One male producer liked The White Villa  but wouldn’t produce it. Another male reader (who was married to an actress) said that he enjoyed reading the play, but would never let his wife star in it. A third producer claimed that he would produce the play, except that women in the audience would hate the play’s truthful narrative, saying “Women won’t stand for the truth.” Edith Ellis eventually produced the play herself and would self-produce a majority of her works.

In 1936, Ellis began transcribing works about life after death. She said this idea came from a New England farm boy who was killed by a British soldier in 1781.  These works include: Incarnation: A Plea from the Masters, (1936), Open the Door!, (1935), We Knew These Men, (1943) and Love in the Afterlife, (1956)

She also wrote silent film scenarios for Samuel Goldwyn.

Feminism in theatre 

In 1909, Ellis joined the Society of Dramatic Authors, a feminist group for women dramatics. Including members like Rachel Crothers, this group was a way for Ellis to network with other women in the industry.

Although Ellis rejected the suffragette title, she was the most vocal directress at the time when it came to her political beliefs concerning women. Ellis’s commercial success as a playwright and director meant that she could present productions with feminist narratives. Having never categorized her work as feminist, she was able to present plays that disrupted expectations of gender roles, particularly the notion that women were passively happy in the domestic sphere.

Additionally, most of the plays that Ellis directed were not written by her, but written by other women. Edith Ellis produced women’s plays almost exclusively.

Directing theory 
Ellis developed a feminist directing theory. In her words: “My methods differ somewhat from those of the men directors. The men like first to put the company through the rough outline of the play, the mechanics as we say, leaving the characterizations to be developed later along with details and business. I prefer to stay ‘living’ the play from the first and working out the detail as we go slowly along. In this way the sense of reality is created, and the play is already properly colored.” 

According to Ellis, women biologically made better directors because women had an ability to impart their knowledge to the cast, whereas male directors did not have the inborn emotional inclination or intuition of women. The only advantage that men had as directors, according to Ellis, was their ability to obtain directing positions. To some scholars, this part of her theory is problematic because Ellis attributes differences in gender to biological causes.

A major element of Ellis’ directing theory was maintaining an actor’s agency regarding character interpretations. According to Ellis, it was crucial that directors not eliminate the intelligence of the actor. As a former actress, Ellis was very familiar with the lowly treatment of actors by their directors. Actresses (female actors) were treated especially poorly by directors, so Ellis made a point to grant actresses agency in her rehearsal and performance space.

Works
A Batch of Blunders, 1897
Mrs. B. O'Shaughnessy (Wash Lady), 1900
Because I Love You, 1903
The Point of View, 1904
Mary and John, 1905
The Wrong Man, 1905
Contrary Mary, 1905
Ben of Broken Bow, 1905
The Swallow, 1906
Mary Jane's Pa, 1906
My Man (with F. Halsey), 1910
He Fell In Love With His Wife, 1910
Seven Sisters, 1912
Partners, 1912
The Love Wager, 1912
Verspers, 1912
Fields of Flax, 1912
The Man Higher Up, 1912
The Amethyst Ring, 1913
Cupid's Ladder, 1915
Make Believe, 1915
Man with the Black Gloves, 1915,
The Devil's Garden, 1915
Making Dick Over, 1916
Mrs. Clancey's Car Ride, with Edward Ells, 1918
Whose Little Bride Are You, 1919
Bravo, Claudia, 1919
Mrs. Jimmie Thompson (with Norman S. Rose), 1920
The White Villa, 1921
Betty's Last Bet, 1921
The Judsons Entertain, 1922
The Illustrious Tartarin, 1922
White Collars, 1924
The Moon and Sixpence, 1924
The Last Chapter (with Edward Ellis), 1930
The Lady of La Paz, 1926

References

Further reading

External links
 

1866 births
1960 deaths
American women dramatists and playwrights
American stage actresses
19th-century American actresses
20th-century American actresses
19th-century American dramatists and playwrights
19th-century American women writers
20th-century American dramatists and playwrights
20th-century American women writers
People from Coldwater, Michigan
Actresses from Michigan
Writers from Michigan